Amin Kamil (1924–2014) was a Kashmiri poet.

Life

Kamil was born at Kaprin, a village in South Kashmir. He graduated in Arts from the Punjab University and took his degree in Law from the Aligarh Muslim University. He joined the Bar in 1947 and continued to practice Law until 1949, when he was appointed a lecturer in Sri Pratap College, Srinagar. He was closely associated with Progressive Writers' Movement of that time and under its influence switched over from Urdu to Kashmiri as his medium of expression. He joined the State Cultural Academy when it was set up in 1958 and was appointed the Convener for the Kashmiri language. He later became Editor for Kashmiri and edited the two journals of the Academy – Sheeraza and Son Adab with distinction for many years. He retired from the service of the Academy in 1979.

Fiction
In 1958, Gati Manz Gaash (Light amidst darkness) was published, a novel inspired by the well-known observation of Mahatma Gandhi in the context of the aftermath of the partition of the Indian sub-continent in 1947, that in the midst of darkness prevailing everywhere he had found a ray of light in Kashmir alone.

Kamil's collection of short stories, "Kathi Manz Kath" (Story within Story) published in mid-60s includes his most highly regarded work, "Kokar Jang" (The Cockfight). The Cockfight is considered as the most popular story in the Kashmiri literature. It has been translated into many Indian languages and has appeared in English translation in anthologies such as Indian Short Stories 1900–2000 edited by I. Vi. Ramakrishan; Contemporary Kashmiri Short Stories edited by Hriday Kaul Bharati, Neerja Mattoo; Contemporary Indian Short Stories Vol 3 all published by Sahitya Akademi, New Delhi. The Cockfight is prescribed in the school and university curriculum in Jammu and Kashmir. It has also appeared in Best Loved Indian Stories of the Century published by Penguin India in 1999. Prof. J L Koul writes about this story that "...perhaps, the comic muse at its subtlest best (though not unmixed with irony) in Kashmiri short story is to be seen in Amin Kamil's Hini Rahman and Kokar Jang, particularly in the latter, in which the foibles and eccentricities of character of the two women neighbors, Jaana Bits and Shah Maal, are expressed through their respective cocks."

Poetry

Writing in The Encyclopedia of Indian Literature, Ghulam Nabi Gauhar says of Kamil: "He is a master of Kashmiri Ghazal and has to his credit poems of eternal value."

Awards and honours
Amin Kamil won the Sahitya Akademi Award in 1967 for his book of poems, Laveh Te Praveh.

Kamil has won awards from the Jammu & Kashmir Cultural Academy, the State Government of Jammu & Kashmir, Robes of Honor from many prestigious organisations, Sahitya Akademi Award (1967) International Irfan Foundation Award, Kashmir University's Lifetime Achievement Award, and Padma Shri in the year 2005 (Literature & Education) from the Indian government. Recently, a two-day national seminar on Amin Kamil was held in Aligarh Muslim University in which Kamil was recognised. Jammu & Kashmir Academy of Art, Culture and Languages published a special issue of its literary magazine Sheeraza on Amin Kamil's life and works which was released in Srinagar in Summer 2011.

Death
Amin Kamil died on 30 October 2014, Thursday morning in Jammu. He was 90 years old.

See also
List of Sahitya Akademi Award winners for Kashmiri

References

External links
 Kamil's official website
 Muse India Archive
 The Cock-fight
 Kamil as Editor

1924 births
Kashmiri poets
Recipients of the Sahitya Akademi Award in Kashmiri
Recipients of the Padma Shri in literature & education
2014 deaths
20th-century Indian poets
Faculty of Law, Aligarh Muslim University alumni
People from Shopian district
Indian male poets
Poets from Jammu and Kashmir
20th-century Indian male writers